Aybek Orozaliyev is a retired Kyrgyzstani footballer who is a midfield. He last played for Algatuban Ashjkhak. He was a member of the Kyrgyzstan national football team.

References
 FIFA.com
 ffkr.kg

1984 births
Kyrgyzstani footballers
Living people
Kyrgyzstan international footballers
Association football midfielders